Holmer or Holmér is a surname. Notable people with the surname include:

Gösta Holmér (1891–1983), Swedish decathlete
Grethe Holmer (1924–2004), Danish actress
Hans Holmér (1930–2002), Chief of the Swedish National Security Service, Stockholm county administrative chief of police
M.R.N. Holmer (1875–1957), English university professor and writer who worked in India
Richard Holmer (born 1945), professor of anthropology at Idaho State University
Walt Holmer (1902–1976), American football quarterback and running back in the National Football League

See also
Holmer, a village in Holmer and Shelwick, a civil parish in Herefordshire, England
Holmer Green, village in the parish of Little Missenden, Buckinghamshire, England